The UEFA Nations League is a biennial international football competition contested by the senior men's national teams of the member associations of UEFA, the sport's European governing body. The Croatia national football team contests this tournament in League A, with other major footballing nations. The team entered the Nations League's inaugural 2018–19 edition in League A, along with England and Spain in January 2018.

Records

2018–19 League A

Group stage

2020–21 League A

Group stage

2022–23 League A

Group stage

Finals

Semi-finals

List of matches

Statistics

Players with most appearances

Top goalscorers

See also
 Croatia at the FIFA World Cup
 Croatia at the UEFA European Championship

Notes

References 

Countries at the UEFA Nations League
UEFA Nations League